Jaylon Scott is an American college basketball player for the College of Charleston Cougars of the NCAA Division I.

College career

Bethel College (2018–2022)
In his freshman year, Scott averaged 12.9 points, 10.3 rebounds per game and 2.0 steals per game. In his first collegiate game, he recorded 13 points, 7 rebounds and 3 blocks in a 69-83 losing effort over the William Woods Owls. The following game, he recorded his first double-double as he notched 21 points and 13 rebounds in a 77-69 win over the Doane College Tigers. Due to his strong outing in his first collegiate season, he was awarded the KCAC Freshman of the Year in 2019.

He recorded his first triple-double of his collegiate career after notching 10 points, 14 rebounds and 13 assists in a 92-112 loss to the William Penn University Statesmen.

During his senior year, he recorded a monstrous double-double involving 22 rebounds and a collegiate career-high 14 assists in a 73-75 losing effort to the Oklahoma Wesleyan University Eagles. He was also honored as one of the players mentioned in the NAIA All-American Team list.

College of Charleston (2022–Present)
On April 27, 2022, Scott was signed to become a member of the College of Charleston Cougars men's basketball under head coach Pat Kelsey.

Personal life
Jaylon Scott was raised in Plano, Texas where he attended Weatherford elementary school and Wilson middle school. Scott attended Allen High School in Allen, Texas and was a major in Business Administration. Scott has two siblings, an older brother named Kenton Scott and a younger sister named Maya. He grew up in the Creekside Village apartment complex which at the time was owned by a different leasing company and called Lodgetree apartments. There he met one of his best childhood friends, author Daniel Almon, and the two along with Scott’s older brother were inseparable. He honed his impressive athletic skills on the shabby apartment basketball courts and parking lots. At age 13 he along with his family moved to Allen, Texas.

Career statistics

College

|-
| style="text-align:left;"| 2018–19
| style="text-align:left;"| Bethel College
| 30 || 30 || 31.6 || .429 || .318 || .661 || 10.3 || 2.4 || 2.0 || 1.1 || 12.9
|-
| style="text-align:left;"| 2019–20
| style="text-align:left;"| Bethel College
| 32 || 32 || 34.5 || .429 || .321 || .647 || 11.8 || 2.6 || 2.1 || .7 || 13.3
|-
| style="text-align:left;"| 2020–21
| style="text-align:left;"| Bethel College
| 28 || 28 || 34.6 || .455 || .213 || .662 || 12.0 || 4.7 || 2.0 || .9 || 16.5
|-
| style="text-align:left;"| 2021–22
| style="text-align:left;"| Bethel College
| 31 || 31 || 34.7 || .455 || .316 || .679 || 11.3 || 5.2 || 2.5 || .6 || 19.1

References

External links
Bethel College Bio
EuroBasket bio

Living people
American men's basketball players
Bethel College (Kansas) alumni
Bethel Threshers men's basketball
College of Charleston Cougars men's basketball players
Shooting guards
Small forwards
Year of birth missing (living people)